is a private university in Chuo, Tokyo, Japan, formerly called St. Luke's College of Nursing. The school started in 1920 as a high school to educate nurses for the affiliated St. Luke's International Hospital. It was chartered as a three-year college in 1954 and became a four-year college in 1964. In 1980 and 1988 postgraduate doctoral programs were established, including a Doctor of Nursing Practice (DNP) course.

External links
 Official website (in English)
 Official website 

Educational institutions established in 1920
Private universities and colleges in Japan
Universities and colleges in Tokyo
Nursing schools in Japan
1920 establishments in Japan
Christian universities and colleges in Japan